Vaux is a commune in the Allier department in Auvergne-Rhône-Alpes in central France. The 19th-century French journalist, chansonnier and politician Agénor Altaroche (1811–1884) died in Vaux.

Population

See also
Communes of the Allier department

References

Communes of Allier
Allier communes articles needing translation from French Wikipedia